Cupaniopsis anacardioides, with common names  tuckeroo, carrotwood, beach tamarind and green-leaved tamarind, is a species of flowering tree in the soapberry family, Sapindaceae, that is native to eastern and northern Australia. The usual habitat is littoral rainforest on sand or near estuaries. The range of natural distribution is from Seven Mile Beach, New South Wales (34.8° S) to Queensland, northern Australia and New Guinea.

Cupaniopsis anacardioides is an invasive species in some parts of the United States, primarily Florida and Hawaii.

Description 
The bark is smooth grey or brown with raised horizontal lines. The bases of the trees are usually flanged.

Leaves are pinnate and alternate with six to ten leaflets. The tips are often notched or blunt. Leaf veins are evident on both sides. The veins are mostly raised underneath.

Greenish white flowers form on panicles from May to July. The fruit is an orange to yellow capsule with three lobes. There is a glossy dark brown seed inside each lobe. The seeds are covered in a bright orange aril. Fruit ripens from October to December, attracting many birds including Australasian figbird, olive-backed oriole and pied currawong.

Germination from fresh seed occurs without difficulty, particularly if the seed is removed from the aril and soaked for a few days.

Uses
It is an attractive plant as an ornamental or a street tree, particularly in coastal areas as it is salt tolerant.

References

External links 

anacardioides
Sapindales of Australia
Trees of Australia
Flora of New South Wales
Flora of Queensland
Rosids of Western Australia
Flora of the Northern Territory
Flora of New Guinea
Ornamental trees
Drought-tolerant trees